Rodenbek may refer to:

Rodenbek (municipality), in Schleswig-Holstein, Germany
Rodenbek (river), in North Germany, tributary of the Alster
SS Rodenbek, a cargo ship built 1944 in Germany